Deisenhofer is a surname. Notable people with the surname include:

 Eduard Deisenhofer (1909-1945), German Waffen-SS officer and commander 
Johann Deisenhofer (born 1943), German biochemist